Must Be the Music is a British television musical talent competition contested by aspiring singers and musicians drawn from public auditions. The show is a music competition and reality show that was broadcast in the United Kingdom and Ireland. Auditions were held in Edinburgh, Manchester, London and also held in Ireland. The show began airing in August on Sky1, and was also simulcast in HD. Fearne Cotton presented the show. The first and only series was won by Emma's Imagination, a female singer from Dumfries.

The winning act received £100,000 to help kick-start their music career. In the initial televised audition phase as well as the three semi-finals and final, contestants sang in front of the judges - Jamie Cullum, Sharleen Spiteri and Dizzee Rascal. Among the notable artists competing in the show were Irish fiddler Daithí Ó Drónaí and The Trinity Band, who went on to win Live and Unsigned in 2011.

The show was broadcast on Sky1. Must Be the Music was devised as a spin-off for the highly successful Got to Dance, which finished its first series in February. The live finals were held at Wembley Arena. Must Be the Music had a live audience behind the judges. During the live finals, the public voted for their favourite act, which they wished to keep in the competition.

Format

The auditions took place in early August 2010 in front of the three celebrity judges. Unlike X-Factor which limits itself only to singers, Must Be the Music was open to all musicians who were allowed to play their own compositions. Fearne Cotton described the show as  ‘It’s about acts who can sing, play… or do both!’

The audition process culminated in the judges selecting 15 acts for the semi-finals which took place at the Fountain Studios in Wembley (which is also used for The X Factor). Each semi-final had five acts with a five-minute voting window at the end of the show to decide which two acts from each semi-final proceeded to the final, which took place on 19 September at Wembley Arena.

The winner of the show received a £100,000 cash fund rather than a record contract with an emphasis on giving the acts control over their careers. Additionally, every song performed on the show was available to download from iTunes and Sky Songs with 100 per cent of the net profits of the songs and merchandise going to the musicians. A case at the High Court in February 2014 established that the format was not copied from a proposal from another company.

Semi-finalists

Songs and Dates Performed

Released singles

Polish version
From March 2011 the first edition of the program, titled Must Be the Music. Tylko muzyka, has been broadcast by Polish TV station Polsat. The show became very successful among the audience with approximately 3 million viewers each season and by 2016 was running its eleventh edition. The first Polish winner, Enej band, achieved great commercial success that added to the show's popularity. Numerous Polish artists launched their careers through the program, such as LemON, Red Lips, Oberschlesien, Marcin Patrzalek, Tune or Shata QS. On 8 May 2016, after the final of the show's eleventh edition, the show was canceled by Polsat.

See also
Got to Dance
Pop Idol
The X Factor
The Voice UK
Fame Academy
Britain's Got Talent
Must Be the Music (Poland)

References

External links

2010 British television series debuts
2010 British television series endings
2010s British music television series
English-language television shows
Music competitions in the United Kingdom
Sky UK original programming
Television series by Banijay
Television shows set in Manchester